Yacouba Bamba (born 16 December 1975) is a Ivorian former professional footballer who played as a forward for nine teams during his career, spanning four countries.

He represented the Ivory Coast national team four times, each time as a substitute.

Personal life
Bamba was born in Marcory, a commune of Abidjan, Ivory Coast.

Bamba's son, Axel, is also a footballer who currently plays for Real Sporting de Gijón.

Honours
Africa Sports
 Côte d'Ivoire Premier Division: 1996
 Côte d'Ivoire Cup runner-up: 1996, 1997

Yverdon-Sport
 Swiss Cup runner-up: 2000–01

FK Karvan
 Azerbaijan Premier League runner-up: 2005–06
 Azerbaijan Cup runner-up: 2005–06

Khazar Lankaran
 Azerbaijan Cup: 2007–08
 CIS Cup: 2008

Individual
 Azerbaijan Premier League top scorer: 2005–06

References

External links

Player profile 

Living people
1975 births
Footballers from Abidjan
Ivorian footballers
Association football forwards
Africa Sports d'Abidjan players
FC Zürich players
FC Wil players
Diyarbakırspor footballers
Süper Lig players
Khazar Lankaran FK players
SC Young Fellows Juventus players
Ivory Coast international footballers
Ivorian expatriate footballers
Ivorian expatriate sportspeople in Switzerland
Expatriate footballers in Switzerland
Ivorian expatriate sportspeople in Azerbaijan
Expatriate footballers in Azerbaijan
Ivorian expatriate sportspeople in Turkey
Expatriate footballers in Turkey